Amidu Issahaku Chinnia (born 20 May 1978) is a Ghanaian politician and member of the New Patriotic Party. He is the member of parliament for the Sissala East Constituency, Upper West Region and also the Deputy Regional Minister.

Early life and education 
Amidu hails from Bugubelle in the Upper West Region of Ghana. He attended Tumu Secondary Technical School and continued to Nusrat Jahan Ahmadiyya College of Education in Wa to be trained as a professional teacher. He holds an MPhil in Agriculture (Horticulture)

References 

1978 births
Living people
Ghanaian Muslims
New Patriotic Party politicians
Ghanaian MPs 2021–2025
People from Upper West Region